Coleophora algeriensis is a moth of the family Coleophoridae. It is found in Spain, Portugal, Sicily and North Africa.

The larvae feed on Suaeda species, including Suaeda maritima. They create a dark brown, very slender, trivalved tubular leaf or silken case of 9–10 mm. The mouth opening is oval and broadly flanged. The mouth angle is about 35°. It is not known whether this species is a leafminer, or feeds on the fruits of their host.

References

algeriensis
Moths described in 1952
Moths of Europe
Moths of Africa